Tracy Williams(born March 12, 1964) is an actor and former professional basketball player and former head coach of the Saitama Broncos in the Japanese Bj League.

Head coaching record

|-
| style="text-align:left;"|Saitama Broncos
| style="text-align:left;"|2012-13
| 52||15||37|||| style="text-align:center;"|10th in Bj Eastern|||-||-||-||
| style="text-align:center;"|19th in Bj
|-

References

1964 births
Living people
Campbell Fighting Camels basketball players
Saitama Broncos coaches
American men's basketball players